Alison Mary Stuart Routledge (born 29 April 1960) is a New Zealand actress, known for her performance as Joanne in the 1985 cult film The Quiet Earth. She has also had roles in the films such as The Returning and Nothing Special. Routledge graduated from Toi Whakaari: New Zealand Drama School in 1982 with a Diploma in Acting.

Filmography

Film

Television

References

External links 
 

1960 births
Living people
New Zealand stage actresses
New Zealand television actresses
New Zealand film actresses
Toi Whakaari alumni